Aa figueroi is a species of orchid in the genus Aa.

It is native to Colombia. It is listed as an Appendix II species by CITES.

References

figueroi
Plants described in 2014